National Highway 730, commonly referred to as NH 730 is a national highway in  India. It is a spur road of National Highway 30. NH-730 traverses the state of Uttar Pradesh in India.

Route 
Pilibhit, Puranpur, Khutar, Gola Gokaran Nath, Lakhimpur Kheri, Nanpara, Bahraich, Shravasti, Balrampur, Tulsipur, Pachperwa, Barhani Bazar, Shohratgarh, Siddharthnagar, Pharenda, Maharajganj, Partawal, Kaptanganj, Padrauna, Tamkuhiraj.

Junctions  

  Terminal near Pilibhit.
  near Puranpur.
  near Khutar.
  near Lakhimpur.                          
  near Kundwa.
  near Nanpara.
  near Bahraich. 
  near Balrampur.
  near Siddharthnagar.
  near Pharenda.
  near Maharajganj.
  near Partawal.
  near Pandrauna.
  Terminal near Tamkuhiraj.

See also 

 List of National Highways in India by highway number
 List of National Highways in India by state

References

External links 

 NH 730 on OpenStreetMap

National highways in India
National Highways in Uttar Pradesh